2017 Melbourne car attack may refer to:

 January 2017 Melbourne car attack, which occurred on 20 January
 December 2017 Melbourne car attack, which occurred on 21 December